Macroschisma rubrum is a species of sea snail, a marine gastropoda mollusk in the family Fissurellidae.

Distribution
The length of the shell varies between 14 mm and 21 mm.

Distribution
This marine species occurs off the Philippines.

References

 Poppe G.T., Tagaro S.P. & Stahlschmidt P. (2015). New shelled molluscan species from the central Philippines I. Visaya. 4(3): 15-59. page(s): 17, pl. 1 figs 1-2.
 Poppe G.T. & Tagaro S.P. (2020). The Fissurellidae from the Philippines with the description of 26 new species. Visaya. suppl. 13: 1-131

External links
 Worms Link

rubrum
Gastropods described in 2015